Shraga Feivel Mendlowitz (1886 – 7 September 1948) was a leader of American Orthodoxy and founder of key institutions such as Torah U'Mesorah, an outreach and educational organization. He is also known for having taken the reins in 1921 and building Yeshiva Torah Vodaas, a major early day Brooklyn-based Yeshiva. His policies were often informed by Torah im Derech Eretz. In the words of Rabbi Moshe Feinstein: "Were it not for him, there would be no Torah study and no Fear of Heaven at all in America."

Biography
Mendlowitz was born in Világ (today Svetlice, Slovakia), in the Austria-Hungarian Empire, a small town near the border of Poland, to a Hasidic family: Moshe and Bas-Sheva Mendlowitz. Shraga Feivel pronounced his family name Mendelovich. 

His mother died when he was ten. He was twelve when the family relocated to Mezőlaborc (now ), where he studied "with Reb Aaron, dayyan of Mezo-Laboretz, who considered him his top pupil." Having received semicha at age 17, he continued his studies under Rabbi Simcha Bunim Schreiber (the Shevet Sofer, grandson of the Chatam Sofer). Throughout his life, however, he refused to use the title of Rabbi and insisted on being referred to as "Mr. Mendlowitz."

At age 22, he "married his step-mother's younger sister, Bluma Rachel." in the town of Humenné, Slovakia, and began to study several not well known Jewish writings, including the works of Rabbi Samson Raphael Hirsch; this briefly led to controversy until he could prove the relevance of Hirsch's work in defending the Orthodox viewpoint against attempts at reforming Jewish practice.

Activities 
He actively sought positions in Germany and the United States, with the intention of disseminating knowledge of Judaism to Jews previously unexposed to their heritage, and in September 1913, he arrived alone in Philadelphia. He lived in Scranton, Pennsylvania, for seven years, teaching in the local Talmud Torah (afternoon program in Jewish studies). In 1920 he was able to bring his family from Hungary, and settled in  Williamsburg, Brooklyn.

Reb Shraga Feivel joined forces with Chazan Yossele Rosenblatt in 1923, to produce Dos Yiddishe Licht, a short-lived English and Yiddish language weekly that included articles of comment and inspiration. It eventually became a daily but was forced to discontinue publication in 1927, because of financial difficulties. In fact, Chazan Rosenblatt went on a year-long concert tour to pay back the monies owed to creditors. 

The founding members of Yeshiva Torah Vodaas soon offered him the principalship of the institution. Originally starting off as an elementary school, Rabbi Shraga Feivel soon added the second Yeshiva high school in America. (The first being the Talmudical Academy, associated with Yeshiva College, founded in 1916.) The yeshiva opened its mesivta in 1926 and then under Rabbi Mendlowitz' direction, another early development in America (but also in competition with Yeshiva College), a post-graduate program. Rabbi Mendlowitz first appointed Rabbi Gedalia Schorr to the faculty of the Yeshiva, later to become its principal and Rosh Yeshiva.

Despite his devotion to Torah Vodaath he assisted in the founding (both personally and financially) of several similar institutions, such as Mesivta Chaim Berlin (to which he relinquished a number of his top pupils), Telshe Cleveland and Beis Medrash Gevoha. All grew to occupy important places in 20th century American Orthodoxy.

His work in Jewish education extended to several other organisations he founded. Aish Dos was a specialized institution that focused on teaching outreach skills, Torah U'mesora was a nationwide umbrella organization for Jewish day schools, and Beis Medrash Elyon was one of America's first post-graduate yeshivas (which also included a kollel). In 1931 he founded Camp Mesivta, the first yeshiva day camp.

Mendelowitz renounced eating meat after the Holocaust, saying: "There has been enough killing in the world."

References 

 
 Hamodia article: 

20th-century American rabbis
Mashgiach ruchani
American Haredi rabbis
Hungarian Orthodox rabbis
Haredi rabbis in Europe
American people of Hungarian-Jewish descent
Austro-Hungarian emigrants to the United States
People from Williamsburg, Brooklyn
People from Scranton, Pennsylvania
1886 births
1948 deaths
Torah Vodaath rosh yeshivas